The 1964–65 snooker season was the series of professional snooker tournaments played between July 1964 and June 1965. The following table outlines the results for the season's events.


Calendar

Notes

References

1965
1964 in snooker
1965 in snooker